187 is a year on the Julian calendar.

187 may also refer to:

Entertainment 
One Eight Seven, a 1997 American crime thriller film released by Warner Bros.

Music 
Deep Cover (song), also known as 187 and 187um, a 1992 song by Dr. Dre and Snoop Doggy Dogg from the American action thriller film Deep Cover
187, a 1998 album by 187 Lockdown
187, a 2012 mixtape by Tyga

Sports 
187 (professional wrestling), a wrestling act

Other uses 
187 (number)
187 (slang), a slang of the California Penal Code that defines the crime of murder
187 BC, a year from the Roman calendar
187, a character in the film Dracula 3000